Source hypothesis can refer to:

 Documentary hypothesis, for the Pentateuch of the Hebrew Bible
 Two-source hypothesis, for the Synoptic Gospels of the Greek New Testament
 Three-source hypothesis, for the Synoptic Gospels of the Greek New Testament
 Four-document hypothesis, for the Synoptic Gospels of the Greek New Testament